Arthur Stokes (13 November 1875 – 4 April 1949) was a British cyclist. He competed in two events at the 1912 Summer Olympics.

References

External links
 

1875 births
1949 deaths
English male cyclists
Olympic cyclists of Great Britain
Cyclists at the 1912 Summer Olympics
Sportspeople from Coventry